Parakramabahu V (born 1311) was King of Gampola who ruled from 1344 or 1345 to 1359. He was the Second King of Gampola co-ruling with his brother Bhuvanaikabahu IV, and was succeeded by his nephew Vikramabahu III.

See also
 List of Sri Lankan monarchs
 History of Sri Lanka

References

External links
 Kings & Rulers of Sri Lanka
 Codrington's Short History of Ceylon

Monarchs of Gampola
House of Siri Sanga Bo
P
P